Society Lawyer is a 1939 crime film directed by Edwin L. Marin and starring Walter Pidgeon and Virginia Bruce. It is a milder remake of the pre-Code Penthouse (1933).

Box office
According to MGM records the film made $312,000 in the US and Canada and $160,000 elsewhere resulting in a profit of $64,000.

Plot summary

Cast
 Walter Pidgeon as Christopher Durant
 Virginia Bruce as Pat Abbott
 Leo Carrillo as Tony Gazotti
 Eduardo Ciannelli as Jim Crelliman
 Lee Bowman as Phil Siddall
 Frances Mercer as Sue Leonard
 Ann Morriss as Judy Barton
 Herbert Mundin as Layton
 Frank M. Thomas as Lieutenant Stevens

References

External links
 
 
 
 
 lobby poster

1939 films
1939 crime films
American black-and-white films
Remakes of American films
1930s English-language films
Films directed by Edwin L. Marin
Metro-Goldwyn-Mayer films
American crime films
Films scored by Edward Ward (composer)
1930s American films